John Speed (1542–1629) was an English cartographer and historian.

John Speed may also refer to:

John Speed (martyr) (died 1594), English Roman Catholic martyr
John James Speed (1803–1867), American farmer, merchant, politician, and pioneer in telegraphy
John Speed (Kentucky), judge and owner of Farmington in Louisville, Kentucky, and father of Joshua Fry Speed and James Speed

See also
John Speed Smith (1792–1854), U.S. Representative